Centerville is an unincorporated community in Boise County, in the U.S. state of Idaho.

History
Centerville was a mining community named from its location in the center of the Boise Basin. A post office was established as Centreville in 1864, the spelling was changed to Centerville in 1893, and the post office closed in 1952. An early variant name was "Hogum".

Centerville's population was 217 in 1909.

References

Unincorporated communities in Boise County, Idaho
Unincorporated communities in Idaho